"Girl You Need a Change of Mind" is a song by Eddie Kendricks. It was released on the album People ... Hold On in May 1972 on the Tamla Records label.  The following year, the song went to #13 on the US soul chart and #87 on the Hot 100. "Girl You Need a Change of Mind" has been described as one of the first disco records.

It is listed as #92 on Rolling Stone's list of The 100 Greatest Motown Songs.

Overview
The lyrics of the song describe a man talking to a woman campaigning for women's rights, saying "I'm for women's rights/I just want equal nights".

Cover Versions
In 1996, R&B singer D'Angelo recorded the song for the Get on the Bus soundtrack.

References

1972 songs
Eddie Kendricks songs
Songs written by Leonard Caston Jr.
Songs written by Anita Poree